The brown-breasted bulbul (Pycnonotus xanthorrhous) is a songbird in the family Pycnonotidae. The species was first described by John Anderson in 1869.It is found in south-eastern Asia from central and southern China to Myanmar and northern Thailand.

Taxonomy and systematics
Alternate names for the brown-breasted bulbul include Anderson's bulbul and yellow-vented bulbul (not to be confused with the species of the same name, Pycnonotus goiavier).

Subspecies
Two subspecies are recognized:
 P. x. xanthorrhous - Anderson, 1869: Found from south-western China and northern Myanmar to northern Indochina
 P. x. andersoni - (R. Swinhoe, 1870): Originally described as a separate species in the genus Ixos. Found in central and southern China

References

brown-breasted bulbul
Birds of China
Birds of Myanmar
Birds of Yunnan
brown-breasted bulbul
Taxonomy articles created by Polbot